Viscount  was a Japanese naval officer and politician. Upon distinguishing himself during his command of two cruisers in the First Sino-Japanese War, Saitō rose rapidly to the rank of rear admiral by 1900. He was promoted to vice admiral during the Russo-Japanese War in 1904. After serving as Minister of the Navy from 1906 to 1914, Saitō held the position of Governor-General of Korea from 1919 to 1927 and again from 1929 to 1931. When Inukai Tsuyoshi was assassinated in May 1932, he took his place as prime minister and served one term in office. Saitō returned to public service as Lord Keeper of the Privy Seal in February 1935 but was assassinated only a year later during the February 26 Incident. Saitō along with Takahashi Korekiyo were the last former prime ministers of Japan to be assassinated until 2022, with the assassination of Shinzo Abe.

Early life

Saitō was born in Mizusawa Domain, Mutsu Province (part of present-day Ōshū City Iwate Prefecture), as the son of a samurai of the Mizusawa Clan. In 1879, he graduated from the 6th class Imperial Japanese Naval Academy, ranking third out of a class of 17 cadets. He was commissioned an ensign on September 8, 1882, and promoted to sub-lieutenant on February 25, 1884.

Military career

In 1884, Saitō went to the United States for four years to study as a military attaché. Promoted to lieutenant on July 14, 1886; in 1888, after returning to Japan, he served as a member of the Imperial Japanese Navy General Staff.

After his promotion to lieutenant commander on December 20, 1893, he served as executive officer on the cruiser  and battleship .

He received rapid promotions to commander on December 1, 1897 and to captain on December 27. On November 10, 1898, he became Vice Minister of the Navy, and was promoted to rear admiral on May 20, 1900

Political career
Saitō was again Vice Navy Minister at the start of the Russo-Japanese War. He was promoted to vice admiral on June 6, 1904. He was awarded the Order of the Rising Sun (1st class) in 1906. After the end of the war, he served as Navy Minister for 8 years, from 1906 to 1914, during which time he continually strove for expansion of the navy.

On September 21, 1907, Saitō was ennobled with the title of danshaku (baron) under the kazoku peerage system. On October 16, 1912, he was promoted to full admiral. However, on April 16, 1914, Saitō was forced to resign from his post as Navy Minister due implications of his involvement in the Siemens scandal, and officially entered the reserves.

In September 1919, Saitō was appointed as the third Japanese Governor-General of Korea. Rising to the post right after the culmination of the Korean independence movement, he was subject to an immediate assassination attempt by Kang Woo-kyu, a radical Korean nationalist. He served as governor-general of Korea twice—in 1919–1927, and again in 1929–1931, implementing a series of measures to moderate Japan's policies on Koreans. He was awarded the Order of the Paulownia Flowers in 1924. On April 29, 1925, his title was elevated to that of shishaku (viscount).

In 1927, Saitō was a member of the Japanese delegation at the Geneva Naval Conference on Disarmament, and he later became a privy councillor.

Prime Minister
Following the assassination of Prime Minister Inukai Tsuyoshi on May 15, 1932 by fanatical navy officers who thought Inukai far too conciliatory (the May 15 Incident), Prince Saionji Kinmochi, one of the Emperor's closest and strongest advisors, attempted to stop the slide towards a military take-over of the government. In a compromise move, Saitō was chosen to be Inukai's successor. Sadao Araki remained as War Minister and immediately began making demands on the new government. During Saitō's tenure, Japan recognized the independence of Manchukuo, and withdrew from the League of Nations.

Saitō's administration was one of the longer-serving ones of the inter-war period, and it continued until July 8, 1934, when the cabinet resigned en masse because of the Teijin Incident bribery scandal. Keisuke Okada succeeded as prime minister.

Saitō continued to be an important figure in politics as Lord Keeper of the Privy Seal from December 26, 1935, but was assassinated during the February 26 Incident of 1936 at his home in Yotsuya, Tokyo. Takahashi, his predecessor, was shot dead the same day, along with several other top-rank politicians targeted by the rebels.

Saitō was posthumously awarded the Supreme Order of the Chrysanthemum.

Honours
From the corresponding article in the Japanese Wikipedia

Peerages
 Baron (21 September 1907)
 Viscount (9 April 1925)

Decorations
 Order of the Sacred Treasure, Fourth Class (20 June 1899; Fifth Class: 25 November 1896; Sixth Class: 26 May 1893)
 Order of the Golden Kite, Second Class (1 April 1906; Fourth Class: 23 May 1896)
 Grand Cordon of the Order of the Rising Sun (1 April 1906; Second Class: 27 December 1901; Sixth Class: 23 May 1896)
 Grand Cordon of the Order of the Rising Sun with Paulownia Flowers (11 February 1924)
 Grand Cordon of the Order of the Chrysanthemum (26 February 1936; posthumous)

Foreign decorations
 : Honorary Knight Grand Cross of the Order of the Bath (GCB) (15 May 1906)
 : Order of the Red Eagle, Knight 1st Class (26 February 1907)
 : Knight Grand Class of the Order of Saints Maurice and Lazarus (1 July 1907) 
 : Grand Officer of the Legion d'Honneur (17 December 1907; Commander: 4 April 1901)
 : Knight Grand Cross of the Order of Orange-Nassau (31 May 1911)
  Holy See: 
 Knight Grand Cross of the Order of St. Sylvester (17 January 1922)
 Knight Grand Cross of the Order of Pius IX (23 January 1932)

Notes

References
 
 
  /; /; OCLC 49704795
   /; OCLC 44090600
  /; /; OCLC 45172740

External links
 
 Republic of Korea
 

1858 births
1936 deaths
20th-century prime ministers of Japan
Prime Ministers of Japan
Government ministers of Japan
Ministers of the Imperial Japanese Navy
Governors-General of Korea
Imperial Japanese Navy admirals
Military personnel from Iwate Prefecture
Kazoku
Japanese military personnel of the First Sino-Japanese War
Japanese military personnel of the Russo-Japanese War
Assassinated prime ministers of Japan
Assassinated Japanese politicians
Assassinated military personnel
Recipients of the Order of the Rising Sun
Honorary Knights Grand Cross of the Order of the Bath
Recipients of the Order of the Paulownia Flowers
Recipients of the Order of the Golden Kite, 2nd class
Grand Officiers of the Légion d'honneur
Knights Grand Cross of the Order of Orange-Nassau
Knights Grand Cross of the Order of Saints Maurice and Lazarus
Knights Grand Cross of the Order of Pope Pius IX
Knights of the Order of St. Sylvester
Assassinated nobility
Deaths by firearm in Japan
People murdered in Tokyo
Foreign ministers of Japan
Politicians from Iwate Prefecture
Japanese naval attachés
Imperial Japanese Naval Academy alumni